Róbert Semeník (born 13 January 1973) is a retired Slovak footballer.

Semeník spent two seasons with FC Nitra, appearing in 17 league matches. He is one of the all-time leading goal-scorers among Slovak footballers.

References

External links
 
 Profile 
 Profile 

1973 births
Living people
Slovak footballers
Slovakia international footballers
Association football forwards
Slovak Super Liga players
Czech First League players
Süper Lig players
Nemzeti Bajnokság I players
FC VSS Košice players
FK Teplice players
Gençlerbirliği S.K. footballers
FK Dukla Banská Bystrica players
FC Nitra players
FK Drnovice players
MŠK Novohrad Lučenec players
Győri ETO FC players
Slovak expatriate footballers
Expatriate footballers in Hungary
Expatriate footballers in the Czech Republic
Expatriate footballers in Turkey
People from Veľký Krtíš
Sportspeople from the Banská Bystrica Region